Villasila de Valdavia is a municipality located in the province of Palencia, Castile and León, Spain. According to the 2004 census (INE), the municipality has a population of 92 inhabitants.

Administrative division 
Municipal area includes the neighbouring village of:
 Villamelendro de Valdavia.

References 

Municipalities in the Province of Palencia